Boulder Valley is a valley in the U.S. state of Nevada.

Boulder Valley was so named on account of the boulders the valley floor contains.

References

Valleys of Eureka County, Nevada
Valleys of Lander County, Nevada